The Candlelight Party is a liberal party in Cambodia. The party was a member of the Council of Asian Liberals and Democrats, Liberal International, and the Alliance of Democrats. It is the largest opposition party in Cambodia, and the main challenger to the ruling Cambodian People's Party. The party resumed political activity in October 2021 after being inactive since 2012.

The party, founded in 1995 as the Khmer Nation Party, renamed the Sam Rainsy Party in 1998, and recently in 2018, it was renamed the Candlelight Party. This party is currently  the official opposition to the ruling Cambodian People's Party. Since the decline of the junior coalition partner, FUNCINPEC, in the 2008 National Assembly elections, the Candlelight Party is now considered the second largest party and the largest opposition party in Cambodia. The party won 15 of the 123 seats in the National Assembly in the 1998 elections, 24 seats in the 2003 elections, and 26 seats in the 2008 elections. The CP won two seats in the 2006 Senate elections. In 2009, it formally allied with the Human Rights Party in the Democratic Movement of Change.

In 2008, party activist Tuot Saron was arrested on a charge of "being an accomplice to unlawful confinement". International human rights groups including Human Rights Watch and Amnesty International described the charges as a politically motivated attempt to intimidate other SRP activists. Tuot Saron was released on 26 November 2010, following a Royal Pardon decree.

Election results

General elections

Communal elections

Senate elections

See also
:Category:Candlelight Party politicians
Liberalism
Contributions to liberal theory
Liberalism worldwide
List of liberal parties
Liberal democracy

References

External links
Sam Rainsy Party official site

1995 establishments in Cambodia
Cambodian democracy movements
Liberal parties in Cambodia
Nationalist parties in Cambodia
Political parties established in 1995
Political parties in Cambodia